Otterhampton is a village and civil parish in the Sedgemoor district of Somerset, England, between Bridgwater and the Steart Peninsula.  The civil parish includes the larger village of Combwich and the small village of Steart.

History

It was recorded in the Domesday book as Utramestone meaning 'The outermost enclosure' from the Old English ultramest and tun. An alternative derivation is from the Saxon, meaning "place of Ottrane" the original Saxon thane.

Otterhampton was part of the hundred of Cannington.

The Steart peninsula has flooded many times during the last millennium. The most severe
recent floods occurred in 1981. By 1997, a combination of coastal erosion, sea level rise and wave action had made some
of the defences distinctly fragile and at risk from failure. As a result, in 2002 the Environment Agency produced the Stolford to Combwich Coastal Defence Strategy Study to examine options for the future.

Governance

The parish council has responsibility for local issues, including setting an annual precept (local rate) to cover the council’s operating costs and producing annual accounts for public scrutiny. The parish council evaluates local planning applications and works with the local police, district council officers, and neighbourhood watch groups on matters of crime, security, and traffic. The parish council's role also includes initiating projects for the maintenance and repair of parish facilities, as well as consulting with the district council on the maintenance, repair, and improvement of highways, drainage, footpaths, public transport, and street cleaning. Conservation matters (including trees and listed buildings) and environmental issues are also the responsibility of the council.

The village falls within the Non-metropolitan district of Sedgemoor, which was formed on 1 April 1974 under the Local Government Act 1972, having previously been part of Bridgwater Rural District, which is responsible for local planning and building control, local roads, council housing, environmental health, markets and fairs, refuse collection and recycling, cemeteries and crematoria, leisure services, parks, and tourism.

Somerset County Council is responsible for running the largest and most expensive local services such as education, social services, libraries, main roads, public transport, policing and fire services, trading standards, waste disposal and strategic planning.

It is also part of the Bridgwater and West Somerset county constituency represented in the House of Commons of the Parliament of the United Kingdom. It elects one Member of Parliament (MP) by the first past the post system of election.

Religious sites

The Church of St Peter was built in 1870 by J. Knowles for Susanna Lewes Jeffery, and has been designated by English Heritage as a Grade II listed building.

All Saints church, dates from the 14th century, and is now a Grade II* listed building. It overlooks the River Parrett. A church was established on the site in the 12th century, was valued at £5 in 1291, although the current building largely dates from the 14th. The perpendicular west tower was added later and has an Elizabethan bell-frame with 4 bells, one of which dates from the 16th century and two others are dated 1617 and 1737. The original dedication was to St Peter, however it was later renamed All Saints. The interior includes a Norman font with a Jacobean cover, a screen from the 16th century and 17th century communion rails. It is now in the care of the Churches Conservation Trust.

References

External links

Villages in Sedgemoor
Somerset Levels
Civil parishes in Somerset